Lulu Kennedy MBE is the Founder & Director of Fashion East & MAN & the Lulu & Co clothing line. She is also Editor-at-large of Condé Nast's biannual LOVE magazine as ujjwal as well as working as a consultant for brands.

Early life

Born in 1969, Lulu Kennedy grew up between Ibiza, Devon & Sicily, spending the early 1990s, a decade she was heavily influenced by, working on raves in Naples, Italy, . Upon returning to the UK in 1995, she got a job in a vintage shop at Kensington Market and found herself drawn into fashion.

Career

Fashion East

In 1996 Kennedy started working for the owners of the Old Truman Brewery on Brick Lane in East London. Together in 2000 they launched a non-profit initiative, Fashion East, dedicated to scouting and nurturing young designers, enabling them to show at London Fashion Week.

Following Fashion East's success, she set up MAN in 2005 in partnership with Topman – an identical support scheme for emerging menswear designers.

Kennedy earned a reputation for discovering and championing new design talent. She launched many of London's leading fashion names including: Jonathan Saunders, House of Holland, Roksanda Ilincic, Gareth Pugh, Richard Nicoll, Christopher Shannon, Charles Jeffrey, and  Craig Green.

Lulu & Co.

Kennedy launched her own clothing brand Lulu & Co in 2010 to mark Fashion East's 10th anniversary. Initially created as a limited edition capsule collection of ten archive dresses by ten Fashion East designers, Kennedy went on to develop the line in house, often collaborating with friends such as artists Tim Noble & Sue Webster, Barry Reigate, Bella Freud & Susie Bick, art director Boyo Studio, and photographer Mary McCartney. It is carried internationally at stockists including Liberty and Net-a-Porter.

Press

Described as the "fairy godmother of British fashion" by international press, Kennedy was awarded an MBE title in March 2012 for her services to the fashion industry.

‘For young designers across the world, it helps to have a fairy godmother. New York's budding talent has Anna Wintour. London has Lulu Kennedy... Ms Kennedy is a big factor in the evolution of London Fashion Week.’ Nadya Masidlover, reporter at The Wall Street Journal.

‘Ms. Kennedy has helped so many that she actually put a city back on the fashion map.’ Eric Wilson & Cathy Horyn, Fashion Critics at The New York Times stated in their list of ‘Fashion’s New Order’ describing the power players of today.

‘The queen of East London’s fiercely competitive fashion scene’ Luke Leitch, Deputy Fashion Editor, The Daily Telegraph.

‘A spark can't be rationalised, it just is. And that is strangely comforting. Kennedy and co's non-profit initiative has played a significant part in reconfiguring the landscape of British fashion – on nothing more than passion and gut instinct.’ Dean Mayo Davies, writer-at-large, Dazed.

Kennedy has also been acknowledged in a number of other industry lists including; the 25 Most important People in Fashion in The Daily Telegraph, The Power 1000 – London's most influential people 2013 in The London Evening Standard and Business of Fashion's ‘BoF500’.

Personal life

Kennedy was married to artist and photographer Mat Collishaw from 2007 to 2008.
 
Lulu Kennedy's daughter Rainbow Kennedy was born in March 2014. They live in East London.

References

British fashion designers
Living people
English fashion
Members of the Order of the British Empire
Year of birth missing (living people)